Agustin Egurrola (born 8 September 1968, in Warsaw) is a Polish professional dancer, choreographer, international judge of ballroom and modern dance competitions, and television personality.

Biography
Egurrola's mother was Polish while his father was Cuban.

He is the multiple Polish Champion in Latin dance and South-American Show Dance. His dancing partner was Joanna Szokalska, with whom he gained twelve titles of Polish Champion. They also represented Poland in multiple World and European Championships.

Since 2007 Egurrola has served as a judge on the Polish television series You Can Dance: Po prostu tańcz!. In 2013 he also joined the judging panel of Poland's Got Talent, replacing Robert Kozyra.

References

1968 births
Living people
Polish people of Cuban descent
Polish ballroom dancers
Polish male dancers
Polish choreographers
Place of birth missing (living people)